Pavlova Ves is a village and municipality in Liptovský Mikuláš District in the Žilina Region of northern Slovakia.

History 
In historical records the village was first mentioned in 1469 AD.

Geography 
The municipality lies at an altitude of 622 metres and covers an area of 6.83 km². It has a population of about 250 people.

References

External links 
 
 
 https://web.archive.org/web/20080111223415/http://www.statistics.sk/mosmis/eng/run.html 
 http://pavlovaves.weblahko.sk/Domov.html

Villages and municipalities in Liptovský Mikuláš District